Glenside may refer to:

Places
 Glenside, South Australia, a suburb of Adelaide
 Glenside, Saskatchewan, Canada, a village 
 Rural Municipality of Glenside No. 377, Saskatchewan
 Glenside, Bristol, a campus of the University of the West of England
 Glenside Museum
 Glenside Hospital, formerly Beaufort War Hospital, Bristol, England
 Glenside, New Zealand, a suburb of Wellington
 Glenside railway station, South Ayrshire, Scotland
 Glenside, Pennsylvania, United States, in Montgomery County
 Glenside (SEPTA station), a Regional Rail station in Glenside, Pennsylvania

Other uses
 CFAV Glenside (YTB 644), a Canadian Forces tugboat